Jack Reacher is the protagonist of a series of crime thriller novels by British author Lee Child. In the stories, Jack Reacher was a major in the US Army's military police. Having left the Army at age 36, Reacher roams the United States, taking odd jobs and investigating suspicious and frequently dangerous situations.

, 27 novels plus some short stories have been published. The most recent novel is No Plan B. Three novels have been adapted for the screen. Two of the adaptations are films, starring Tom Cruise as Reacher: Jack Reacher (2012) from the ninth novel, One Shot, and Jack Reacher: Never Go Back (2016) from the eighteenth novel, Never Go Back. The third adaption is a television series on Amazon Prime Video, starring Alan Ritchson: Reacher (2022). This was adapted from the first novel, Killing Floor.

Development and author's commentary

Development
At the time Lee Child sat down to write his first novel Killing Floor, he was unemployed, having been made redundant from his position as a presentation director for Granada Television. According to Child, authorship was a purely pragmatic decision: "I wasn't one of these people that felt compelled to write. It had to keep a roof over our heads, so it was totally, totally 110% commercially motivated."

Critics have perceived other influences in Jack Reacher's creation. Bob Cornwell quotes Lee Child's reply in another interview as having created Reacher "as an antidote, to all the depressed and miserable alcoholics that increasingly peopled the genre". Similarly, editor Otto Penzler published an essay by Child explaining that Jack Reacher was created deliberately in contrast to the prevailing trends in crime fiction. His name is short and commonplace, as opposed to quirky or unusual; Reacher's  personal ethics and wandering lifestyle are reminiscent of the chivalrous knight errant of medieval lore as opposed to an anti-hero tormented by addiction and haunted by past misbehavior.

The character's name first came to Child in a supermarket when an old lady, noting the span of Child's arms, asked for his help in reaching out to a can of pears. On seeing this, Child's wife commented that if his writing career did not work out he could "always get a job as a reacher in a supermarket". Reacher's ex-military background was a specific and tactical choice on his behalf. Child has explained, "I thought that I would do a book that's not the same as everybody else's. Everybody else had their guy working: a private eye in Boston or a police lieutenant in L.A., or wherever. I thought, 'Well, he won't be working, and he won't live anywhere, and let's just take it from there.'" Child also felt that this origin would lend itself to the character's personality and nomadic lifestyle: "This idea of the rootless alienation has got to come from somewhere, and I noticed that the most alienated people are always ex-military, because it's like going from one solar system to the other, it's so different. So that was an easy choice: Make him ex-military. Then make him ex-military police because, broadly speaking, these would be crime novels, and he had to have some investigative experience, and he had to understand procedures and forensics and so on. So that part was all set in stone".

Similarities between Reacher and Lee Child
Numerous critics have pointed out the various similarities between Lee Child and Jack Reacher. Child tends to agree with such observations: "I was huge as a kid and Reacher's stature is me translated as a kid. I enjoyed being bigger and fighting shamelessly. I've done a fair amount of headbutting. It's an awesome manoeuvre." Andy Martin notes that "just as Reacher is half-Rimbaud, half-Rambo, Child is both art-for-art's-sake Parnassian and ruthless businessman."

Curtis, as well as Harding and Iggulden, have also considered the role Child's dismissal from Granada had on Reacher's development. Curtis notes that "Child created Reacher from the smoldering embers of his own rage. It might seem like a simplistic theory, but it's true. Like the author, Reacher was workplace surplus: He was a military policeman in an era of Army downsizing. The act of leaving his job turned Reacher into a protective figure, an avenging angel." He finds that Reacher's actions are a manifestation of Child's anger at his sacking and that his violent ways of dealing with villains is "cathartic" to the author.

Author's commentary and interpretation

Child views Jack Reacher as a "happy-go-lucky guy. He has quirks and problems, but the thing is, he doesn't know he's got them. Hence, no tedious self-pity. He's smart and strong, an introvert, but any anguish he suffers is caused by others." He was asked about the casting of Tom Cruise in the role of Jack Reacher. Child replied that "Reacher's size in the books is a metaphor for an unstoppable force". In physique and appearance, Child has compared him to Rugby Player Lawrence Dallaglio.

He has also referred to Reacher on multiple occasions as a 'knight-errant' and in an interview for Time magazine describes the character as: "(He's) two things in one. On the surface, he is an ex-military cop who is suddenly dumped out into the civilian world. He doesn't fit in, and he spends his time wandering America, seeing the things that he's never had time to see before. He's trying to stay out of trouble, but masterfully once a year getting into trouble. He's also the descendant of a very ancient tradition: the noble loner, the knight errant, the mysterious stranger, who has shown up in stories forever… He is a truly universal character... I'm writing the modern iteration of a character who has existed for thousands of years."

In another interview for Esquire magazine, Child further analyses the mythology of his character:

The stories that I love are basically about the knight-errant, the mysterious stranger. And the reason why people think that's an essentially American paradigm is the Westerns. The Westerns were absolutely rock solid with that stuff. You know, the mysterious rider comes in off the range, sorts out the problem, and rides off into the sunset. It is just such a total paradigm, but not invented in America. That was imported from the medieval tales of Europe. The knight-errant: literally a knight, somehow banished and forced to wander the land doing good deeds. It's part of storytelling in every culture. Japan has it with the ronin myth; every culture has this Robin Hood idea. So really, that character was forced out of Europe as Europe became more densely populated and more civilized. That character no longer had stories in Europe; it had to migrate to where the frontier was still open and dangerous, which was America, essentially. So the character, I think, is actually universal and historic, most recently, normally represented in America. I think the Westerns saw it firmly adopted by America, so yeah, right now, we think of this as a completely American character, but really, it's more historic than that. But I'm very happy to have that reference made. 

Child also views Reacher as "post-feminist" stating that he does not parlay in "gender distinction...Reacher likes strong, realistic women, and he treats women with respect...he doesn't cut them any slack, but also he has no negative preconceptions. If you're a woman, he will be your friend; but if necessary, he will kill you."

Fictional biography

Childhood and formative years
Jack Reacher was born on a military base in Berlin, on 29 October 1960. Regular references are made to the fact that Reacher's given name is Jack, which is not a nickname for John, and that he has no middle name.  His military record officially refers to him as "Jack (none) Reacher". From the time he was a boy, his family, even his mother, simply called him "Reacher", an appellation that has stayed with him, but was never given to his brother.

Reacher's mother Josephine Moutier Reacher (née Moutier) was a French national, and Reacher was fluent in French from early childhood, but as he admits in The Affair (2011) he speaks the language Un peu, mais lentement ("A little, but slowly"). Reacher's maternal grandfather was at the Battle of Verdun in the First World War and in the French Resistance in the Second, and lived to a ripe old age, which in Reacher's view means that his grandfather had "beaten the odds". Reacher's mother as a 13 year old guided Allied Air Crews to safety in WWII.

Military years and profile

After being shunted around the world, growing up on U.S. military bases where his father, Stan, a Marine Captain, was stationed, he gained an education in basic survival as well as an opportunity to enter the United States Military Academy at West Point. After four years at West Point (1979 to 1983) Reacher achieved the ranks of 2nd lieutenant, 1st lieutenant, captain, and major, including an intervening demotion from major to captain in 1990 during his tenure in the military police. His commanding officer, Leon Garber, promoted Reacher twice in 18 months, making  him the youngest peacetime major anyone could remember. During his tenure, his achievements were recognised in the form of citations and awards including the Silver Star, the Defense Superior Service Medal, two Legions of Merit, Soldier's Medal, Bronze Star, Army Commendation Medal, and a second Silver Star and Purple Heart for wounds sustained in the bombing of the US Marine Corps barracks in Beirut in 1983.

While his Silver Star and Purple Heart are cited on his profile, all of the other medal citations involve official secrets and are therefore redacted. The short story "Deep Down" hints that he possibly was awarded the Legion of Merit as a result of exposing a female liaison officer who was leaking confidential information to the Soviet Union.

Reacher served in the Army's Military Police Corps, resigning his commission and mustering out at the rank of major. His unit, the fictional 110th Special Investigations Unit, was formed to handle exceptionally tough cases. He left the armed forces in 1997, partly due to a reduction in the forces and partly because he verbally offended a lieutenant colonel during an investigation in Mississippi, who then singled him out for discharge.

Among his formal qualifications, Reacher is described as the only non-Marine to win the Wimbledon Cup, a US Marine Corps 1000 Yard Invitational Rifle Competition; achieving a record score in 1988. (Although the Wimbledon Cup is in fact a 1,000 yard long-range shooting competition, it is not at all exclusive to the US Marine Corps; since 1875, the championship has been held in most years by the National Rifle Association during the National Rifle and Pistol Matches, and is open to both military and civilian shooters.  The actual winner of the 1988 Wimbledon Cup was Earl R. Libetrau, with a score of 197-10X, and 99 on the shootoff for the win—which was not a record score.)  Anecdotally his fitness reports rated him well above average in the classroom, excellent in the field, fluently bilingual in English and French, passable in Spanish, outstanding on all man-portable weaponry, and beyond outstanding at hand-to-hand combat.

Later years
After leaving the Army, Reacher became a drifter, his only baggage a folding toothbrush, although after the September 11 attacks, with restrictions on wire transfers in the light of fraud he is obliged to carry an ATM card and photo ID in the form of a (generally expired) American passport.

Emily Sargent, while conducting an interview with Lee Child, describes Reacher's post-military life as follows:

You will never find Reacher going to the laundry or doing the ironing. When his clothes get dirty he simply goes to the local hardware store and buys a functional pair of chinos and a workman's shirt and stuffs the old ones in the bin. No mortgage, no wife, no ties, he is a perfectly free agent, unlimited and unbound, incapable of ever settling down.

Lee Child describes Reacher's obsession to wander about:

He's an ex-military policeman, and he was demobilized in his middle thirties after having served all of his adult life in the [U.S.] Army and having grown up on Marine bases, because his father was a Marine. The idea was to have a character that was plausibly rootless. Most people who are wanderers do it for other reasons—they are mentally ill, or something like that. Reacher is completely competent, but he's just habituated to this fragmented life in the military, so he can't settle into civilian society. The idea of staying anywhere for more than a few days is anathema to him.

Demeanor and personality
Reacher himself expounds on a hypothesis about this vagrant lifestyle in Never Go Back. He states that he is genetically predisposed to roaming about. He asserts that some peoples had a natural wanderlust, such as the British Empire, the Vikings, and the Polynesians. He recognizes the economic reasons for their voyages but argues that "some of them could not stop". He believes that, when prehistoric humans lived in small bands, a gene evolved to prevent inbreeding. Consequently, "every generation and every small band had at least one person who had to wander". This would lead to "mixing up of gene pools" and would be "healthier all around". Reacher concludes:

Reacher's large physique means his character is sometimes mistaken by other people. For example, in Die Trying, Reacher is wrongly suspected by the FBI of being involved in a kidnapping, which assesses him (solely on the basis of a few photos) as such: "The big guy is different. Different clothes, different stance, different physically. He could be foreign, at least partly, or maybe second generation. Fair hair and blue eyes, but there's something in his face. Maybe he's European, perhaps a European mercenary or terrorist." Reacher is aware of this perception. In Make Me Reacher gets off a train in a remote town called Mother's Rest, simply because he likes the name of the town. When he sees a woman approaching him with a look of expectation, he immediately understands that the person she was waiting for must be very tall like him, as it is his standout feature when people first meet him.

In Echo Burning, Reacher narrates how he first turned "his fear into aggression". He was about four when he watched a television show on space adventures. One episode depicted a space monster which then terrified the young Reacher. He was unable to sleep for days, thinking the monster was under his bed and would get him if he tried to sleep. According to Reacher, he then became angry: "Not at myself for being afraid, because as far as I was concerned the thing was totally real and I should be afraid. I got mad at the thing for making me afraid. For threatening me". Reacher then one night "kind of exploded with fury". In his words, Reacher "raced down the monster" and successfully changed his fear into fury. He also stated he has never been scared since.

This fact is later referenced in Never Go Back, when an Army psychological study of fear in children is cited that shows Reacher to have abnormally fast reflexes and aggression levels at the age of six; Reacher believes that this abnormal level of aggression at that age is not due to genetics, as the Army report suggested, but because he got tired of being frightened, and trained himself "to turn fear into aggression, automatically".

Reacher seldom shows remorse for the numerous felonies he perpetrates and has a primal sense of justice. In Personal, after killing a thug, he defends his actions to his distraught accomplice, Casey Nice, by stating the man could have spent his life performing good deeds such as "helping old ladies across the street", "raising funds for Africa" or "volunteering in the library". Instead the man extorted money and hurt people and when "finally he opened the wrong door, what came out at him was his problem, not mine".

This primitivity on the part of Reacher is commented upon in Never Go Back, in which Reacher is described by Susan Turner as being like "something feral....It's like you've been sanded down to nothing but yes and no, and you and them, and black and white, and live or die. You're like a predator. Cold and hard." (p. 176–177) However, when she witnesses Reacher's outrage at the hurt inflicted upon an innocent waitress, she reconsiders and states that he is actually not feral as she had earlier presumed. Furthermore, she notes that Reacher had until then attempted to solve only her problems, neglecting the problems of his own:

 And you've done nothing but chip away at my problem. You're ignoring your own, with the Big Dog. Which is just as serious. Therefore, you still care for others. Which means you can't really be feral. I imagine caring for others is the first thing to go. And you still know right from wrong. Which all means you're OK.

This underlying kindness perceived by Turner is visible in many of Reacher's actions: he stands up for the right of women in both Echo Burning, whose central plot involves him aiding a woman's escape from her abusive husband, and in Worth Dying For, in which he breaks the nose of an abusive husband for beating up his wife. He is also shown to be sympathetic to those in need, as seen in The Hard Way where he bequeaths Edward Lane's fees paid to him for the medical treatment and living expenses of a man whom Lane had betrayed many years back.

This point is further elucidated in Personal, when Reacher reminisces while standing at his mother's grave:

She had said, 'You've got the strength of two normal boys. What are you going to do with it?' I hadn't replied. Our silence was part of the ritual. She answered for me. She said, 'You're going to do the right thing.' And I had tried, mostly, which had sometimes caused me trouble, and sometimes won me medals of my own.

Skills

Reacher is described as brutally proficient in hand-to-hand combat. He is quite fast for his height, and often fights opponents his size or larger. His skill is attributed to the fact that he grew up all over the world, due to being in a Marine Corps family. While he is not a master in any one form of combat, he tends to incorporate moves from various styles. His favorite moves are headbutts, elbow strikes, and kicks to the groin. As Child once put it, "Reacher's fighting style is like throwing a running chainsaw into a crowd." Reacher generally goes with the flow of the fight, caring about winning more than how he wins. However, he plans out how to strike first or react to the first strike, and how he'll make sure the other person never fights him again. As he puts it, "The other guy cares how he wins, I care about pissing on the other guy's grave."

Reacher has an internal clock. He sets a time to wake up at and his body automatically awakens. He often sets a timer in fights to try and get a tactical edge. Reacher also has a fascination with numbers. In Bad Luck and Trouble, Reacher uses this to deduce that the amount of money deposited without his knowledge into his bank account was an attempt by Neagley, his colleague from the Military Police Corps, to contact him.

Reacher has extremely acute deduction skills. He generally gains his information simply from talking to people or making minute observations. He will pick up on a simple pause and relate it back to what he is trying to figure out. He is known as one of the best investigators the Army's Military Police Corps had to offer, and he led a special unit tasked with difficult cases.

Reacher is also described as a skilled marksman, principally in One Shot, being the only non-Marine to win the US Marine Corps 1000 Yard Invitational rifle competition.

Habits and beliefs

Reacher has a love for music, especially blues. It was this affinity that inspires Reacher to get off the bus at the start of Killing Floor, and in the same novel reveals that he has a music collection in his head, replaying tracks as he travels without needing the technology others seem to be obsessed with and burdened by. Reacher explains this to detectives investigating an early morning suicide on a near-deserted New York subway near a visit to a blues club on Bleecker Street.

Reacher espouses no personal religious beliefs but is scathing in his dismissal of town boss Thurman's fundamentalist Christian position in the novel Nothing to Lose: When asked if he is "born again" Reacher says, "Once was enough for me" and later rhetorically asks Thurman, "I'm here to visit the sick and you want to have me beaten up? What kind of Christian are you?" He also mentions at the opening of Bad Luck and Trouble that he avoids Alaska Airlines because "they put a scripture card on the meal trays".

Reacher is also critical of the corruption of traditional spelling, such as the use of contractions like "U" for "you", "lo" for "low", disliking the absence of the apostrophe in DONT WALK pedestrian signage before they were replaced, then noting he also disapproved of replacing words with pictures.

While Reacher knows how to drive, in A Wanted Man he professes to be a bad driver, and in Bad Luck and Trouble he says he cannot rent a car because he does not have a driver's license. In Without Fail Agent Frolich trawls various databases for Reacher, only to discover he is effectively untraceable, because without a driver's license he has no photograph and no address.

Among his few indulgences are casual sex and coffee, which he drinks frequently.

Physical appearance
Bryan Curtis, in an interview with Lee Child, describes Reacher thus:

His face looked like it had been chipped out of rock by a sculptor who had ability but not much time.

From A Wanted Man: "He was one of the largest men she had ever seen outside the NFL. He was extremely tall, and extremely broad, and long-armed, and long-legged. The lawn chair was regular size, but it looked tiny under him. It was bent and crushed out of shape. His knuckles were nearly touching the ground. His neck was thick and his hands were the size of dinner plates...A wild man. But not really. Underneath everything else seemed strangely civilized....His gaze was both wise and appealing, both friendly and bleak, both frank and utterly cynical."

In Never Go Back, he is described as having "a six-pack like a cobbled city street, a chest like a suit of NFL armor, biceps like basketballs, and subcutaneous fat like a Kleenex tissue." In his youth, his physical appearance was likened to that of a "bulked-up greyhound". He also reveals that his size is purely genetic; he states in Persuader and Never Go Back that he is not much of an exercise enthusiast.

He has various scars, most notably a collection of roughly stitched scars on his abdomen caused by a bombing in Lebanon, with ugly raised welts that are later instrumental in saving his life, a  white scar that intersects his shrapnel scar that he received during a knife fight in Gone Tomorrow. Reacher attributes his survival to the rough MASH stitch work.

His various other scars include one from a chest shot with a .38 Special. and a powder burn from a near-miss at point blank range, and one on his arm where his brother struck him with a chisel.

He suffers his first ever broken nose in Worth Dying For, at over 50 years of age.  He resets the bone with a thump from his palm and later puts on a plaster bandage made of duct tape.

Family
Reacher's maternal grandfather, Laurent Moutier, was a furniture restorer in Paris, who, at age 30, volunteered for the French Army in 1914 at the outbreak of World War I, fighting at Verdun and The Somme. Between 1919 and 1929 he was commissioned to produce wooden legs for wounded veterans. Josephine Moutier was his only child. He died in 1974 at age 90. Jack, as a boy, met him three times and is described as having liked him. In Second Son Reacher is impressed with his grandfather's stoic acceptance of approaching death and says that "A man who survived Verdun and The Somme as well as the WWII anti-Nazi Resistance has already beaten the odds".

Reacher's mother, Josephine Moutier Reacher, born in France, was 30 years old when Reacher was born. She met Reacher's father in Korea and married him in the Netherlands. When she was only 13, she joined the French Resistance and under the alias "Beatrice" worked with Le Chemin de Fer Humain (the Human Railroad), saving 80 men. She garroted a schoolmate, a boy who threatened to give her up to the Nazis, and would later receive the Médaille de la Résistance (the Resistance Medal) for further heroism. She was widowed in 1988, and died in 1990 at the age of 60 of lung cancer. Reacher described his mother as "gallic, feminine, obstinate," and "[the] most stubborn woman possible." He also branded her a fatalist as she had concealed her cancer from her children and had refused treatment for a one-year period before her death. However Reacher compares her favourably to his father: "My father hadn't killed the enemy at the age of thirteen. But my mother had. She had lived through desperate times and she had stepped up and done what was necessary." Reacher also has great respect for his mother: at her funeral he buried his Silver Star medal with her, and on learning of her role in World War II, states that he became the man he was because of her. In Die Trying, when the FBI mistakenly assumes Reacher to be in league with the book's villains, the Bureau experts observing Reacher's demeanor on footage from a security camera consider him to be "a foreigner, probably a European mercenary". Additionally, in the same book, Reacher tricks the antagonists into believing he is a French mercenary, speaking French seemingly fluently.

Reacher's father, Stan Reacher, was a United States Marine Corps captain, who served in Korea and Vietnam. His military service kept his family continually moving all around the world to various military bases. At the time of the short story Second Son, when Jack was 13, he was stationed in Okinawa and involved in preparing contingency plans for an invasion of Mainland China. In the same short story, Stan Reacher is depicted as "a child of the depression," coming from a miserly New England family, and as a result was a proponent of the theories of "Waste not, want not," "Make do and mend," and "Don't make an exhibition of oneself."  Jack described his father as "a plain New Hampshire Yankee with an implacable horror of anything fancy...he had no use for wealth and excess. Very compartmentalized guy. Gentle, shy, sweet, loving man, but a stone-cold killer. Next to him I look like Liberace". Jack Reacher furthermore highlighted this dichotomy in his father's behaviour by stating that he would be engaging in violent actions such as "how to angle a claymore mine so the little ball bearings explode outward at exactly the right angle to rip the enemy's spines out of their backs with maximum efficiency" one day, and the next day would be doing something calmer, like "watching birds," After military service, "there was no place left for people like him." He died in 1988. James Stanfield, in an article concludes that "Reacher clearly looked up to and idolised his father, and though Reacher's reasons for leaving the service were very different to his dad's, they've ended up at the same point."

Reacher had only one sibling, brother Joe Reacher, who was two years older than Jack. Physically, Joe was one inch taller  and a "little slighter" than his younger sibling, weighing . Joe was born on a military base in the Philippines, and Jack is described as helping Joe beat up the kids who gave him trouble in school, and vice versa. However Joe also had scuffles with his own brother, given the scar that Jack had put on his forehead during their childhood. Joe was also a West Point graduate, and spent five years in military intelligence, where he never won any of the "good medals", only the "junk awards. "Jack described his brother as being pedantic, and called him a perfectionist, "a man horrified with anything less than the best." Joe is described as joining the US Treasury Department, and died at age 38 in the line of duty, having arranged a meeting with a potential investigation subject. Because he was killed in the line of duty, his name can be found on the Treasury Department's Roll of Honor

While making an analogy in The Affair, Reacher claims to know his paternal grandfather and have many cousins. However, Past Tense, establishes that Reacher hasn't met anyone in his father's family when he visits the town his father came from. During the events of Past Tense, Reacher meets three distant cousins of his, one of whom, Mark Reacher, is involved in a murderous criminal conspiracy, with their distant relation not compelling Reacher to show him any mercy. One of the others is named Stan Reacher, and reveals that Reacher's father (real name William) used his name to enlist in the Marines while underage after killing a local criminal. Stan never knew William's parents, or how closely related they were to his. Stan also is unclear exactly how closely related he and Reacher are to Mark but believes Mark is one of the many grandchildren of a relative Stan never met in person, who made a fortune in real estate. Reacher leaves town with good new stories about his father, but with little additional insight into his exact family tree.

Critical reception and analysis
Critics have noted the strong theme of "justice" pervading the character as well as the book series. Claire E. White characterises the titular protagonist as a "wanderer, a hero who is a bit alienated from the establishment, but whose sense of justice is strong. He reminds (me) a bit of a character from the Old West: the strong, mysterious loner who never stays in town for long." Mike Ripley detected the influence of Jack Schaefer's western novel Shane in the Reacher novel Echo Burning while Bob Cornwell calls the debut Jack Reacher novel  Killing Floor "a classic western". Grantland columnist Bryan Curtis calls the character "a protective figure, an avenging angel" and quotes the author Michael Connelly describing the Reacher book series: "These are postmodern Westerns, they're Shane. A stranger comes to town and sets things right. Then he leaves town." The critic Emily Sargent says of the fictional Reacher: "just the kind of no-nonsense, ramrod hero an intelligent five-year-old would dream up: a strapping, broad-shouldered, idealized father-figure, something akin to God in his wisdom and power, alternately benevolent and overwhelmingly cruel, fair but firm. Good at saving damsels in distress and sorting out bad guys."

Rick Gekoski, writing for The Guardian, takes a similar if darker interpretation of the character: "Reacher is, of course, in a long line of American outcast heroes who abjure emotional ties, head out into the wilderness and take upon their own broad shoulders the primitive moral conscience of the tribe. Too immature to make a sexual commitment, obsessed with death and terror, this archetypal hero of American fiction was first described in Leslie Fiedler's classic Love and Death in the American Novel (1960)." In the same article he also questions whether Fiedler would find that Reacher's hypermasculinity is a sign of the character's "repressed homosexuality".

Malcolm Gladwell, in an article for The New Yorker, perceives a difference in the Reacher character and the traditional Western characters in terms of the symbolism they represent to the general public. In his opinion, "The traditional Western was a fantasy about lawfulness: it was based on a longing for order among those who had been living without it for too long. The heroes conduct themselves according to strict rules of chivalry. They act— insofar as it is possible —with restraint. In the world we live in today, by contrast, we have too much order: we are, as we have been reminded so frequently lately, over-policed. Our contemporary fantasy is about lawlessness: about what would happen if the institutions of civility melted away and all we were left with was a hard-muscled, rangy guy who could do all the necessary calculations in his head to insure that the bad guy got what he had coming. That's why there are rarely any police in Reacher novels—or judges or courts or lawyers or any discussion or consideration of the law. Nor is there any restraint on the part of the hero. He's not pointing toward a more civilized tomorrow. He's leading us back into the wilderness, with the reassurance that our psychopaths are bigger and stronger than the bad guys' psychopaths."

Sargent also notes the dichotomy in Reacher's character, stating that he is intellectual and generous despite his exterior appearance of being "unkempt, unshaven and out of uniform, a loner, avenger, perpetual outsider at odds with the army". In Sargent's express opinion:

Curtis concurs, remarking that "Reacher isn't just a mindless vigilante. He can also be a liberal do-gooder. He has expressed sympathy for gays in the military and undocumented immigrants. In Child's latest book, A Wanted Man, Reacher worries that the Patriot Act will lead to all sorts of 'national security bullshit.' Child has invented a kind of progressive vigilantism. The scumbag is killed, but usually for the right reasons."

Multiple critics have pointed out that the Jack Reacher character is characterized by his spells of silence, with Curtis claiming "Reacher's classic line is silence."

Others have been critical of the various implausibilities and contradictions present in the character and his behavior. Notes The Washington Post journalist Kevin Nance: "The unlikelihoods and outright impossibilities stack up. Ever a frugal sort, Reacher travels mostly by hitchhiking (as he does at the beginning of "A Wanted Man" and 2001's "Echo Burning," both set roughly in the time they were written), even though the practice is roughly as current as bellbottoms and even though his appearance is, as previously established, notably simian. (Not that this deters a series of smart, attractive young women, most of them officers of the law, from jumping into bed with him.) And although he's a loner who seems never so happy — rather like Agent Cooper in "Twin Peaks" — as when sitting quietly in a diner with a cup of black coffee and a piece of pie, he has an uncanny knack for stumbling into the worst kinds of trouble, almost none of it connected to himself." Michael Cavacini has concurred with this, stating that unlike traditional whodunits, where a detective "simply solves a problem because it's his job", Reacher has no formal reason to be involved in anything and consequently "seems to always wind up in a situation where something goes wrong and he must make right".

Accomplices
Lee Child has described Reacher's accomplices and their characterization and origin in the following terms: " The whole cast for each book is new. It kind of depends on what the scenario is and what the set up is. Do I use people that I actually know? In a way yeah, because you met people and you regard them as meta-typical as one thing or another – so as a large extent, yes, they are based on people I've met but not specific individuals."

Pre-military era
Jill Hemingway, age 34 according to a police transmission, was a suspended FBI agent operating freelance in New York during 1977. She had been investigating the criminal activities of a New York mobster, Croselli but her investigation had been shut down and she had been suspended, pending review as part of a deal cut by Croselli with the FBI. She had since tried to unsuccessfully bring Croselli down by getting him to boast of his crimes on tape. She admitted that bringing down Croselli had become somewhat of an obsession for her, stating "[Croselli] burns her up." Hemingway is described as a thin, pale, nervous, blonde woman and she teams up with a nearly seventeen year old Reacher in the novella High Heat to incriminate Croselli. She suffered from heart-related ailments and she dies near the end of the story due to a heart attack after having accomplished her goal. Reacher commented, "She died young, but she had a smile on her face."

Military era
 Elizabeth Deveraux, late 30s, is a former Marine serving as a county sheriff in Carter Crossing, Mississippi in 1997. She appears in The Affair, where she tacitly condones Reacher's highly illegal ways of getting rid of some unsavory characters. She was a potential lover for Reacher, as they had sex several times, but ended up drifting apart.
 Karla Dixon, age unknown, possibly late 30s is a forensic accountant; formerly a Major in the Army and part of Reacher's "110th Special Investigators Unit", which he formed and led in the '90s. They are reunited in Bad Luck and Trouble and secretly rekindle an affair, which they regret not starting back in the Army. She is described as 'dark, very pretty, comparatively small' and slim.  She is extremely good with numbers and shares Reacher's fascination with mathematics.
 Calvin Franz, One of the 110th's special investigators. Calm, resolute, relaxing to be around and good at reassuring people. Franz first appears in The Enemy, working with Reacher in a secondary capacity, and is murdered during the first chapter of Bad Luck and Trouble. He is survived by a wife, and a son who greatly reminds Reacher of his father. He is also mentioned in Never Go Back.
 General Leon Garber, retired, was Reacher's former commanding officer, mentor and close friend. His only child is Jodie. He risked his life to help Reacher in Die Trying, and willed him his house, as his daughter is wealthy, didn't want it and already owns her own New York City home. He also appears in The Enemy and The Affair, and (through his funeral) in Tripwire.
 Jodie Garber-Jacob, 30, is the daughter of General Leon Garber. She met and fell in love with Reacher when she was 15 and was off-limits to him. In Tripwire, she is divorced, using her married name, working as a corporate attorney and reunites romantically with him after her father's funeral. She and Reacher lived together in New York City and upstate New York in Leon's house which was left in his will to Reacher, his surrogate son. She is mentioned in Echo Burning as having moved to Europe. She appears in Tripwire, and The Visitor (Running Blind in the United States).
 Detective Griezman, a German policeman who aides Reacher and his colleagues in hunting an American traitor (who also murdered a German prostitute who Griezman had been sleeping with) in Night School.
 Eileen Ann Hutton, age unknown, is a Brigadier General in the Army's Judge Advocate General's Corps. She and Reacher had a relationship prior to, and featured in, One Shot.
 Dominique Kohl, 29, was a Sergeant First Class on the way up and assigned to Reacher's unit when he was a captain in the Army. She appears in Persuader, where Reacher remembers the events that led to her death ten years earlier.  Kohl is mentioned again in Personal, when Reacher partners with a woman who reminds him of Kohl.
 Stan Lowrey, late 30s, is a member of Reacher's old 110th MP unit. He is handsome, youthful, and full of energy. A kind of man that gets the job done. Reacher describes him as a regular of pool halls and dark alleys, but with a connection to the earth. He appears in Bad Luck and Trouble and The Affair.
 Duncan Munro, late 30s, is a member of Reacher's old 110th MP unit. He appears in The Affair. Initially presented as a somewhat upstart outsider with opinions contrary to Reacher, they come to a consensus by the end of the case.
 Frances Neagley, late 30s, is a partner with a successful private security firm, and former Army Master Sergeant in the Army Military Police. She is of medium height, slim, and has dark hair and eyes. She spends large amounts of time in the gym and has a purely platonic relationship with Reacher. However, in Night School (2016), NSA senior Deputy Marian Sinclair notes Neagley's attraction to Reacher, and her refusal to sleep with him.  Reacher points out that Neagley has haptephobia, "A fear of being touched." When Sinclair asks if the condition is as a result of assault, Reacher responds, "She says she was born with it." Her demeanor suggests that she could be considered a female counterpart to Reacher. Rarely impressed, Reacher describes her as sometimes scary. She appears in Without Fail, The Affair, Bad Luck and Trouble, Night School, and Small Wars and is mentioned in Never Go Back. The first page of Bad Luck and Trouble includes a dedication "For the real Frances L. Neagley", who won a Bouchercon charity auction for the naming rights to a character. Neagley appears as a recurring character in the Reacher TV series, played by Maria Sten.
 Nash Newman, a military pathologist who specializes in identifying battlefield remains and appears in Tripwire.
 Dave O'Donnell, late 30s, is a member of Reacher's old 110th MP unit. He appears in Bad Luck and Trouble. He is "tall, fair, handsome, like a stockbroker... carries an army blade in one pocket and a pair of ceramic brass-knuckles in the other." The ceramic knuckles are made from a composite stronger than steel and harder than brass that gets past any metal detector. He is meticulous, doesn't mind paperwork, and is usually underestimated because he looks like a white-collar office worker.
 Manuel Orozco, part of the 110th MP Unit, Orozco is fond of puns and enjoys opening and closing a zippo lighter to listen to the sound. After leaving the service, he and Jorge Sanchez became struggling casino security consultants in Las Vegas, with Orozco marrying and fathering several children before his murder in Bad Luck and Trouble. Orozco also appears in Night School and is mentioned in Never Go Back.
 Jorge Sanchez, a member of the 110th MP Unit who first appears in The Enemy, serving at Fort Jackson and helping investigate the murder of an Army Rangers officer. Reacher describes "durable, eyes narrowed, with a hint of a smile that showed a gold tooth and was as close as he ever came to showing contentment." Sanchez is also featured in Bad Luck and Trouble, working in Las Vegas with Manuel Orozco, and is mentioned in Never Go Back.
 Rita Scimeca, the victim of a gang rape at Fort Bragg, then-Lieutenant Scimeca hospitalized two of her five attackers. Reacher was the investigating officer. Scimeca appears in The Visitor, as a potential target of the killer.
 Lieutenant Summer, 25, is an African-American Lieutenant in the Army Military Police. She is pretty, petite and slender, and appears in The Enemy. She is Reacher's accomplice throughout the novel and they have a brief relationship. She is promoted to Captain at the end of the novel.
 Calvin Swan, a member of the 110th MP unit. He is described physically as cubic in shape. Swan was stationed in Germany during the Fall of the Berlin Wall and keeps a piece of the wall as a paperweight. He appears in The Enemy and Bad Luck and Trouble, and is mentioned in Never Go Back.
 Colonel Trent, a military base commander featured in The Visitor. Trent was peripherally implicated in an unspecified scandal during one of Reacher's investigations, but Reacher omitted his name from the report after Trent arrived at his office, not to beg for mercy, but to apologize and explain, while believing Reacher had already submitted his report. 
 John White, a CIA officer who appears in Night School as one of Reacher's opposite numbers in the investigation.

Wandering era
 Alice Amanda Aaron, an attorney, appears in Echo Burning.
 Bennett, a British intelligence agent in Personal who works with Reacher due to each of them having a history with one of the suspects behind a sniper attack.
 Carter Carrington, a city attorney who helps Reacher trace his ancestry in Past Tense.
 Martin Cash, an ex-Marine who owns a shooting range. Reacher questions him, and then recruits him as an ally, in One Shot. Robert Duvall plays him in the 2012 film.
 Michelle Chang, an ex-FBI agent turned private investigator. Appears in Make Me.
 Dorothy Coe, a motel maid and long-time enemy of the villains of Worth Dying For, after they were the primary suspects in the disappearance of Dorothy's adopted daughter.
 Susan Duffy, appears in Persuader. She is Reacher's accomplice throughout the novel and they have a brief relationship.
 Finlay, a former Boston police officer, and the chief detective of Margrave, Georgia in Killing Floor. He is portrayed by Malcolm Goodwin in the television series Reacher.
 Franklin, a private detective and associate of Reacher and Helen in One Shot. 
 M.E. (Mary Ellen) Froelich, a Secret Service Agent, appears in Without Fail.
 Abby Gibson, a waitress victimize by mobsters, who becomes one of Reacher's allies in Blue Moon.
 Carmen Greer, a woman with an abusive husband, appears in Echo Burning.
 Lisa Harper, another FBI agent, appears in The Visitor (Running Blind in the United States).
 Paul Hubble, a banker associated with the villains of Killing Floor who turned informant for Joe Reacher, and finds himself being protected by Jack for part of the book. He is portrayed by Marc Bendavid in the television series Reacher.
 Holly Johnson, an FBI agent, appears in Die Trying.
 Detective Theresa Lee an NYPD Detective, appears in Gone Tomorrow.
 Casey Nice, 28, described as having "blonde hair and green eyes and a heart shaped face" is a CIA analyst lent out to the State Department. She reminds Reacher of Dominique Kohl and he sees her as a "young, fit woman in the peak of condition, lean, smooth, somehow flexible and fluent and elastic".  She is shown to take anti-anxiety medication and shares a platonic relationship with Reacher. Casey was born and raised in downstate Illinois, is a graduate from Yale University and has a distinct American accent which is exploited by Reacher when she accompanies him to London in Personal.
 Lauren Pauling, appears in The Hard Way.
 Andrew Peterson, the Deputy police chief of Bolton, South Dakota, who befriends and works with Reacher in 61 Hours.
 Helen Rodin, a determined defense attorney who appears in One Shot and in the live action movie Jack Reacher based on the book, where she is played by Rosamund Pike.
 Officer Roscoe, 30, is a Margrave, Georgia police officer in Killing Floor. She is Reacher's accomplice throughout the novel and they have a brief relationship. Her first name is never revealed in the novel, but she appears in the Reacher TV series as Roscoe Conklin, and is played by Willa Fitzgerald.
 Julia Sorensen, 47, teams up with Reacher in A Wanted Man.
 Susan Turner, the Commanding Officer of Reacher's old unit, appears in 61 Hours and Never Go Back. Turner is Reacher's accomplice throughout the novel and they have a brief relationship. She appears in the film adaptation of Never Go Back, played by Cobie Smulders.
 Vaughan, exact age unknown, is a police officer in Hope, Colorado. She appears in Nothing to Lose.
 Vincent, a motel owner featured in Worth Dying For who provides aide to Reacher at several points, but is also quick to cave to the pressure (both threats and beatings) of the people opposing Reacher.
 Ashley Westwood, a technology journalist based in Los Angeles. He becomes involved in Reacher's adventure in Make Me after a man who had called him with a story (while lacking the evidence to back it up) is murdered.
 Ann Yanni, an NBC reporter who becomes involved with Reacher's investigation in One Shot.

In other media

Film

The 2012 action thriller film Jack Reacher was adapted from the 9th novel, 2005's One Shot, and starred Tom Cruise in the title role. The film was directed by Christopher McQuarrie. Cruise reprised the role in the sequel, Jack Reacher: Never Go Back, an adaptation of the 18th Jack Reacher book, Never Go Back, which was directed by Edward Zwick, and released 21 October 2016.

In 2012 Child commented on Cruise's casting by saying, "Reacher's size in the books is a metaphor for an unstoppable force, which Cruise portrays in his own way." In 2018, Child expressed the opinion that the fans were right about the height of actor portraying the character.

Television

On 14 November 2018, Child announced that he made a deal with Skydance Television and Paramount Television to produce a Jack Reacher series based on Child's novels, during which feature films would no longer be produced. He also stated that Tom Cruise would not be returning to the role, and that another actor would be cast in the role, which he hoped would represent the character more properly than seen in the films. Paramount Television and Skydance Television are said to be producing the potential series. Child said of the recasting:
"I really enjoyed working with Cruise. He's a really, really nice guy. We had a lot of fun. But ultimately the readers are right. The size of Reacher is really, really important and it's a big component of who he is...So what I've decided to do is – there won't be any more movies with Tom Cruise. Instead, we're going to take it to Netflix or something like that. Long-form streaming television, with a completely new actor. We're rebooting and starting over and we're going to try and find the perfect guy.

On 15 July 2019, Variety reported that Amazon will develop the series for Prime Video with Nick Santora as the showrunner, writer and executive producer alongside Child, Don Granger, Christopher McQuarrie, David Ellison, Dana Goldberg and Marcy Ross. On 4 September 2020, Alan Ritchson was cast as the titular role. On 2 December 2021, the series, simply titled Reacher,  premiered 4 February 2022.

In other authors' works
 Reacher is mentioned several times in the Stephen King novel Under the Dome, where he is described by the character Colonel Cox as "the toughest goddam Army cop that ever served, in my humble opinion." Lee Child's endorsement of Under the Dome appears on the cover of at least one edition of the book.
 In the introduction to Good and Valuable Consideration, it is mentioned that while creating his Nick Heller series character, Joseph Finder borrowed many cues from Lee Child's Jack Reacher series.
 David Baldacci's character John Puller is a "bloody ripoff of Jack Reacher" according to Lee Child. Child avenged himself by having Jack Reacher break both arms of a villain named David Baldacci in Never Go Back.

See also

 Jack Reacher (book series)
 Jack (hero)
 Military brat

References
Explanatory notes

Citations

Jack Reacher (book series)
 
 
 
 
 
 
 
 
 
 
 
 
 
 
 
 
 
 
 
 
 
 
 
 

 Further reading

External links 
 Lee Child's official website

 
Action film characters
Characters in British novels of the 20th century
Characters in British novels of the 21st century
Characters in crime novel series
Fictional secret agents and spies
Fictional majors
Fictional military personnel
Fictional vigilantes
Fictional Krav Maga practitioners
Fictional aikidoka
Fictional hoboes
Fictional private investigators
Fictional amateur detectives
Literary characters introduced in 1997
Thriller film characters